The Lamaline Basalts is a formation cropping out in Newfoundland.

References

Neoproterozoic Newfoundland and Labrador
Volcanism of Newfoundland and Labrador